Lina Sandell (full name: Karolina Wilhelmina Sandell-Berg) (3 October 1832 – 27 July 1903) was a Swedish poet and author of gospel hymns.

Background
The daughter of a Lutheran minister, Sandell grew up in the rectory at  Fröderyd parish in the Diocese of Växjö in Småland, Sweden. Lina greatly loved and admired her father. Since she was a frail youngster, she generally preferred to be with him in his study rather than with comrades outdoors.
When Lina was just 12 years of age, she had an experience that greatly shaped her entire life. At an early age she had been stricken with a partial paralysis that confined her to bed much of the time. Though the physicians considered her chance for a complete recovery hopeless, her parents always believed that God would in time make her well again. One Sunday morning, while her parents were in church, Lina began reading the Bible and praying earnestly. When her parents returned, they were amazed to find her dressed and walking freely. After this experience of physical healing, Lina began to write verses expressing her gratitude and love for God and published her first book of spiritual poetry when she was 16.
At the age of 26 she accompanied her father, Jonas Sandell, on a boat trip across Lake Vättern, during which he fell overboard and drowned in her presence. Although Lina had written many hymn texts prior to this tragic experience, now more than ever poetic thoughts began to flow from her broken heart. All of her hymns reflect a tender, childlike trust in her Savior and a deep sense of His abiding presence in her life.

Career
Sandell went on to write over six hundred hymns, including Tryggare kan ingen vara (Children of the Heavenly Father) and Blott en dag (Day by day). She was friends with fellow hymnwriter Agatha Rosenius.

Sandell's popularity owed much to the performances of Oscar Ahnfelt, who set many of her verses to music.  He played his guitar and sang her hymns throughout Scandinavia. Of him she once said, "Ahnfelt has sung my songs into the hearts of the people". The "Swedish Nightingale" Jenny Lind also promoted Sandell's hymns by singing them in concert and financing their publication.

Personal life
She was married in 1867 to wholesale merchant and future member of the Swedish Parliament, Oscar Berg (1839–1903). They established their residence in Stockholm. Their only child died at birth. In 1892, Sandell became ill with typhoid fever. She died in 1903 at the age of seventy and was buried at Solna Church in greater Stockholm. Berg died due to complications caused by diabetes in October that same year.

Legacy
The train Y32 1404, of Krösatågen in Småland and Halland, which moves across the railway tracks between Jönköping-Växjö, Nässjö-Halmstad and Jönköping-Tranås, has been named Lina Sandell.

There is a statue of Sandell at North Park University in Chicago, Illinois.

References

Further reading

External links
Images
Lina Sandell photo
Lina Sandell drawing
Lina Sandell statue in Fröderyd
Articles
The inspiration is called God
Lina Sandell and Oscar Ahnfelt 
Lina Sandell at Augustana Heritage
Lina Sandell in the Pietisten Journal
Swedish and English lyrics
Lina Sandell at HymnTime
Carolina Sandell at the Hymnary
Lina Sandell Berg at the Hymnary
Lina Sandell at Swedish Wikisource
Discography
Lina Sandell on Victor Records 
Streaming audio
Lina Sandell and Oscar Ahnfelt 
Videos

1832 births
1903 deaths
Swedish Lutheran hymnwriters
People from Vetlanda Municipality
Swedish Lutherans
Swedish songwriters
19th-century Swedish writers
19th-century Swedish women writers
Women hymnwriters
19th-century Swedish women musicians
19th-century Lutherans